Wild Seasons: Gathering and Cooking Wild Plants of the Great Plains is a 1993 nonfiction book by author, illustrator, and ethno-botanist Kay Young. It features a variety of wild plants of the Great Plains of the United States, and tells how to prepare them. The book includes a number of recipes, as well as Young's enthusiasm and advocacy for eating wild crops. It was published by University of Nebraska Press.

References

1993 non-fiction books
Nature books
University of Nebraska Press books